Jeffrey Donovan (born May 11, 1968) is an American actor. He played Michael Westen in the television series Burn Notice, and appeared in films such as Hitch, Believe in Me, Changeling, and Come Early Morning. He played Robert F. Kennedy in Clint Eastwood's J. Edgar (2011) and his brother John F. Kennedy in Rob Reiner's LBJ (2016). He had a recurring role in the second season of the TV series Fargo (2015). In 2022, he began starring as NYPD Detective Frank Cosgrove on the revival of the NBC crime drama Law & Order.

Early life
Donovan was born the middle of three boys to Nancy Matthews (1946–2010); his older brother was Michael Donovan ( 1965) and his younger brother is Sean (1970-1987). Donovan’s mother raised her sons alone on welfare after their father abandoned the family. They moved several times before settling in Amesbury, Massachusetts.

At Amesbury High School, Donovan was mentored by a teacher who helped him start a drama club and find a private scholarship, enabling him to participate in a summer program that helped him start his acting career. He attended Bridgewater State College before transferring to the University of Massachusetts Amherst, where he graduated with a Bachelor of Arts in drama.

While attending college, Donovan was a commercial bus driver at UMass Transit Service, where he operated passenger buses as part of the PVTA.  He went on to earn his Master of Fine Arts from New York University's Graduate Acting Program at the Tisch School of the Arts.

Career

Television
Donovan has guest-starred in several television shows, including CSI: Miami, Spin City, Monk, Millennium, Witchblade, The Pretender, Homicide: Life on the Street and Law & Order. In the short-lived TV series Threshold, Donovan played the antihero Dr. Sloan. Donovan also played the recurring role of William Ivers in Crossing Jordan. In 2004, he had his first leading role in the American remake of the British television series Touching Evil with Vera Farmiga on the USA Network.

From 2007 to 2013, Donovan starred in Burn Notice, as Michael Westen, a spy who was burned, seemingly by the CIA or Homeland Security, for reasons unknown to him, and marooned in Miami, Florida. The show follows Westen as he attempts to find out why he was burned and regain his job as a covert intelligence agent, in addition to bringing justice to the people of Miami. Donovan made his directorial debut with the series' episode, "Made Man" which first aired on June 17, 2010. Donovan also directed a prequel film starring co-star Bruce Campbell, titled Burn Notice: The Fall of Sam Axe, which first aired on USA Network on April 17, 2011. The series lasted for seven seasons, received positive reviews from both fans and critics, and was nominated for four Primetime Emmy Awards.

In 2015, Donovan had a recurring role on Fargo as North Dakota mobster Dodd Gerhardt. In 2016, he began starring as Tarot-reading con artist Charlie Haverford in Shut Eye on Hulu. On January 30, 2018, Shut Eye was canceled after two seasons.

In 2021, he was cast as a series regular detective for the 21st season of Law & Order.

Theater
Donovan has also performed on stage in various productions, including Hamlet as the title character, A View from the Bridge as Marco, An Inspector Calls, and Off-Broadway in Things You Shouldn't Say Past Midnight as Gene, The Glory of Living as Clint, regionally in Toys in the Attic as Julian Berniers, On the Waterfront as Terry Malloy, Oedipus as Teiresias and Freedomland (play) as Seth. From October 2008 until spring 2009, he starred in the farce Don't Dress for Dinner in Chicago. Donovan has also performed in the radio dramas On the Waterfront (once again as Terry Malloy), Frozen, and Grapes of Wrath.

Personal life
Donovan has over 20 years of martial arts experience. In college, he earned his black belt in Shotokan karate and competed throughout the state. Later, he studied aikido for over six years and Brazilian jiu-jitsu.

On July 3, 2009, Donovan, a Boston Red Sox baseball fan since childhood, threw the ceremonial first pitch at the game between the Red Sox and the Seattle Mariners at Fenway Park. On July 3, 2010, he once again threw the ceremonial first pitch at Fenway Park, this time at a game between the Red Sox and the Baltimore Orioles.

Donovan married model and actress Michelle Woods in 2012. Their daughter, Claire, was born that same year. Son Lucas was born in 2014 and they had a third child in 2017.

Philanthropy
In 2009, Donovan returned to Amesbury High School where he took part in a career day mentorship program with other successful professionals and presented the school with a $100,000 arts scholarship program. The first $10,000 award was given out to a senior that June.

For many years, Donovan has actively supported Life Rolls On (LRO), a foundation empowering people with spinal cord injuries. On October 4, 2009 he served as one of the chairmen for the 6th Annual LRO annual fundraiser called Night by the Ocean at the Kodak Theatre. Donovan was named Grand Marshal of the 22nd annual AIDS Walk Miami held on April 17, 2010.

Donovan also supports his friends' charity events. In September 2009, while helping Michael Bolton at the 17th Annual Benefit Concert for Women and Children at Risk in Stamford, Connecticut, Donovan auctioned off a "Burn Notice walk-on-part" plus a kiss. Walk on parts usually raise $2,000–$5,000.  With the added kiss, he raised $36,000.

Filmography

Film

Television

Awards and nominations

References

External links

 
 

1968 births
Living people
20th-century American male actors
21st-century American male actors
American male film actors
American male television actors
American male voice actors
American practitioners of Brazilian jiu-jitsu
Bridgewater State University alumni
Male actors from Massachusetts
People from Amesbury, Massachusetts
Tisch School of the Arts alumni
University of Massachusetts Amherst alumni